Sir David Cecil Clementi (born 25 February 1949) is a British business executive and a former Deputy Governor of the Bank of England. He was formerly the Chairman of the BBC.

Clementi holds a number of board positions including chairman of international payments business WorldFirst and vice-chairman at investment managers, Ruffer LLP. He has held numerous other positions including chairman of Prudential plc, one of Britain's largest insurance companies, a non-executive director on the board of governors of the Rio Tinto Group and until June 2015 was chairman of Virgin Money, seeing the business through its IPO. In March 2008, he was announced as Warden of Winchester College and, in 2010, was Master of the Mercers' Company.

Early life
David Cecil Clementi was born on 25 February 1949. His father, Cresswell Clementi, was an Air Vice-Marshal in the Royal Air Force.  His grandfather Cecil Clementi was Governor of Hong Kong from 1925 to 1930 and Governor and Commander-in-Chief of the Straits Settlements from 1930 to 1934. His great-great-grandfather was Italian-Swiss musician Muzio Clementi.

He was educated at Winchester College, where he was captain of athletics and a distinguished footballer. He then went to Lincoln College, Oxford, where he obtained a degree in Philosophy, Politics, and Economics and a blue for athletics. After graduating, he qualified as a chartered accountant. He graduated MBA from Harvard Business School in 1975.

Career
After graduating from Harvard Business School, Clementi commenced a career in the finance industry, which culminated in his appointment as Deputy Governor of the Bank of England. He spent 22 years at investment bank Kleinwort Benson, becoming Chief Executive. His nickname at Kleinwort Benson was "The Duke".

In June 2002, he told the Treasury select committee that a house price crash was a virtual certainty. He said, "I said in April that the level of house price inflation, then running in the mid-teens was unsustainable. Since then we've seen something of an acceleration ... and the longer it goes on, the sharper is likely to be the eventual adjustment."

In July 2003, he was given the task, by the Secretary of State for Constitutional Affairs, Lord Falconer of Thoroton, of undertaking a wide-ranging independent review of the regulation of legal services in England and Wales, now known generally as the Clementi report

In 2004, Clementi was appointed Knight Bachelor.

He was Chairman of Virgin Money from October 2011 until May 2015. He is currently the Chairman of International Payments business WorldFirst.

In January 2017 he was confirmed as the chairman of the newly established BBC Board.

References

1949 births
Living people
Alumni of Lincoln College, Oxford
Prudential plc people
Chairmen of the BBC
People educated at Winchester College
Monetary Policy Committee members
Deputy Governors of the Bank of England
Harvard Business School alumni
British people of Italian descent
Knights Bachelor
BBC Board members
Wardens of Winchester College